Yuri Petrovich Ofman (born 1939) is a Russian mathematician who works in computational complexity theory.

He obtained his Doctorate from Moscow State University, where he was advised by Andrey Kolmogorov.
He did important early work on parallel algorithms for prefix sums and their application in the design of Boolean circuits for addition.

Publications 
 
  Translated in 
 Anatolii A. Karatsuba and Yu. P. Ofman (1962), "Умножение многозначных чисел на автоматах" ("Multiplication of Many-Digital Numbers by Automatic Computers"), Doklady Akademii Nauk SSSR, vol. 146, pages 293–294. (Published by A. N. Kolmogorov, with two separate results by the two authors.)
 Yu. P. Ofman (1965), "A universal automaton". Transactions of the Moscow Mathemathematical Society, volume 14, pages 200–215.

References

Living people
1939 births
Russian mathematicians
Theoretical computer scientists